Solomon Wigle (May 14, 1822 – May 1, 1898) was an Ontario businessman and political figure. He represented Essex in the Legislative Assembly of Ontario from 1867 to 1871 as a Conservative member.

He was born in Gosfield Township, Essex County, Upper Canada in 1822, the son of John Wigle. Originally of German origin, the family changed the spelling of their surname from Weigele to Wigle after settling in the United States. Wigle also served as reeve for the township and warden for Essex County. He married Ann Iler. In 1860, Wigle was awarded the contract for transporting mail between Leamington and Windsor. He later moved to Kingsville, where he was the township treasurer, and served in that function until his death in 1898.

His son Lewis Wigle represented Essex South in the Ontario legislative assembly and the House of Commons. His daughter Esther married doctor Sidney Arthur King, son of the founder of Kingsville.

External links 
The Canadian parliamentary companion HJ Morgan (1869)

Commemorative biographical record of the county of Essex, Ontario ... (1905)

1822 births
1898 deaths
Progressive Conservative Party of Ontario MPPs